Blackwater is a small hamlet in the historic county of Hampshire and the ceremonial county of Dorset, England. Administratively, Blackwater is part of Bournemouth, Christchurch and Poole unitary authority. It is best known for the grade separated road junction between the A338 Ringwood to Bournemouth road and the B3073 road to Bournemouth Airport (and to Christchurch in the opposite direction).
It was once the site of a ferry crossing on the River Stour.

Politics 
Blackwater is part of the Christchurch parliamentary constituency for elections to the House of Commons. It is currently represented by Conservative MP Christopher Chope.

References

Villages in Dorset
Bournemouth, Christchurch and Poole